MFE may refer to:

Businesses and organizations
 McAllen Miller International Airport
 Ministry for the Environment (New Zealand)

Education
 Master of Financial Economics
 Master of Financial Engineering

Other uses
 European Federalist Movement
 Mail for Exchange
 Magnetic fusion energy
 Mauritian Creole, by ISO language code